The Emile Awards is an annual ceremony celebrating excellence and diversity in the European animation film industry. The awards consist of 18 trophies for outstanding accomplishment in European animation, as well as the Lotte Reiniger Lifetime Achievement Award, which is awarded to "an individual in recognition of their lifetime contribution to the art of animation exhibited by an outstanding contribution to excellence in animation." The Emile Awards are presented by the European Animation Awards Association, which was founded in 2015 under the name "European Animation Pride Awards".

Memberships in the European Animation Awards Academy consist of two main categories, Associate (Individual) and Active (Individual, for Associations and Companies). Joining the European Animation Awards Association is open to professionals, students and fans of animation, for a membership fee. All members are permitted to vote for the Emile, while Active members are also granted a vote in the General Assemblies designing the Association's Board Members.

The 1st Emile Awards ceremony took place on 8 December 2017 at Nouveau Siècle in Lille.

History 
While attending the 42nd Annie Awards organized by the International Animated Film Society, Didier Brunner impressed by the vitality and dynamism of this event decided to create a similar event covering the European industry, to celebrate each year the excellence and variety of the European animation know-how.

On 29 July 2019 the 3rd Emile Awards was cancelled as various sponsors had withdrawn their financial support for the event. The EAA are planning to host the awards again in 2020.

Naming the "Emile Awards" 
The Awards name is a tribute of both pioneers animation artists Émile Reynaud and Émile Cohl.

Trophy 
The first Emile Award trophy or statuette will be discovered at the 1st Emile Awards Ceremony. The name of the trophy designer remains unknown for now.

Award categories

Emile Awards 
Best Achievement in a Student Film
Best Direction in an Animated Short Film
Best Background and Character Design in an Animated Short Film 
Best Achievement in a Commissioned Film
Best Direction in a TV/Broadcast Production
Best Writing in a TV/Broadcast Production
Best Storyboard in a TV/Broadcast Production
Best Character Animation in a TV/Broadcast Production
Best Background and Character Design in a TV/Broadcast Production
Best Soundtrack in a TV/Broadcast Production
Best Direction in a Feature Film
Best Writing in a Feature Film
Best Storyboard in a Feature Film
Best Character Animation in a Feature Film
Best Background and Character Design in a Feature Film
Best Soundtrack in a Feature Film

For the 2018 edition, two categories have been added:
Best Sound Design in a TV/Broadcast Production
Best Sound Design in a Feature Film

Life Time Achievement Award 
 Lotte Reiniger Award

See also

 List of animation awards

References

External links
 

Animation awards
Career awards
European film awards
Recurring events established in 2017